Team tactics as well as individual skills are necessities for playing association football. Football is in theory a very simple game,  illustrated by Kevin Keegan's namely assertion that his tactics for winning a match were to "score more goals than the opposition". Tactical prowess within the sport is nevertheless a craftsmanship of its own, and one of the reasons why managers are paid well on the elite level. Well-organised and ready teams are often seen beating teams with more skillful players on paper. Manuals and books generally cover not only individual skills but tactics as well.

Association football teams consist of ten outfield players and one goalkeeper, which makes passing an integral part of game strategy, and is taught to players from a young age. Other skills taught to players on an individual level are dribbling, heading the ball and ball control for receiving the ball. Other skills taught individually are jockeying for defenders, and shot stopping for goalkeepers. In terms of complexity, lower levels of the game such as youth leagues, amateur leagues and semi-professional leagues usually focus on teaching the fundamentals of the game, primarily, whereas higher levels of the game, as it regards to professional football teams, usually increase complexity and level of detail in strategy of the game.

Association football is characterised (when compared to other sports) by an energy-conserving style of play. This is due to the prolonged sessions of play (2x45 minutes of continuous play in a game), the large size of a pitch (standard size is 105x68 metres or 7140 square metres) as well as the limited number of changes a team has at their disposal (three or five changes per team and game). For these reasons, tactics are an important part of getting the most out of the full 90 minutes of play (plus stoppage time).

General principles 

Width and depth are both principles of offence and defence as follows:

Width in attack: The attacking team tries to divide the defence by diversifying points of attack across a broad front, rather than attempting to force advances through narrow channels. This may involve play from the wings, or rapid shifting into open lanes/open space when approaching the goal. Often gaps are made between defenders using the width of wingers. Gaps can then be used to feed the ball to strikers.
Width in defence: The defence responds, either through increasing width or strong side tilt, in an attempt to contract and deny width. Attackers are "shepherded" or channeled into narrower or more crowded avenues of space.
Depth in attack: The attacking side uses the depth of the pitch by moving men either up from the rear, or down from the top, but may use a constant "target striker" or front man to always invoke a presence deep in the defence.
Depth in defence: The defending side also uses depth by marking the supporting players of the opposing team, and holding a man back as cover for elevated opposing players, sometimes in a "sweeper" or "libero" role. The attacking player with the ball will have trouble finding anyone open for a pass. Defenders may alternatively abandon depth temporarily to set an offside trap.
Balance in defence The defence attempts a balanced coverage of space. Defenders do not simply cluster on the right side for example, just because the ball is there at that time.

In general, offences and defences will have opposite interests in terms of positioning during play: While defences want to close the distance to the offense and keep a tight gap to the nearest offensive players, offenses want to create space for a play away from defensive pressure.

Substitutions 

In FIFA competitive 11-a-side matches, teams are allowed to make up to five substitutions during the game. The rules of the competition state that all players and substitutes be named before kick-off and anyone not named in the starting lineup who takes to the field of play is considered a substitution. In non-competitive matches, the use of substitutes must be determined before the match begins, except in friendly international matches, where no more than six substitutes may be brought on.

The most tired players are generally substituted, but only if their substitutes are well trained to fill in the same role, or if the formation is transformed at the same time to accommodate for the substitution.

Coaches often refrain from substituting defensive players in order not to disrupt the defensive posture of the team. Instead, they often replace ineffective attackers or unimaginative midfielders in order to freshen up the attacking posture and increase their chances of scoring.

For a team that is losing a game, a fresh striker can bring more benefit in circumventing an opposed defence line composed of relatively tired players. For a team that is winning a game, a fresh midfielder or a defender can bring more benefit in strengthening the defence against the opposition's attackers (who may be fresh substitutes themselves). In this situation, it is usually imaginative attacking flair players who are replaced by tough-tackling defensive midfielders or defenders.

Injured players may also need to be substituted. For each injured player who must be substituted, the team loses one more opportunity to influence things later in the game to their favour.

Attacking tactics 
A consideration that all teams have to make when in possession of the ball, is what degree of risk-taking to impose on attack. Playing with lower margins may constitute higher reward, but is also associated with higher risks, as defensive sides can exploit transitions to their favour with a counter-attacking style of play. Higher margins means more security in ball control, but may also lead to longer periods of play without creating scoring chances. Association football offense requires high levels of anticipation skills in all its participating players, as a lot of decisions have to be made before the actual attacking play is made.

Attacking 
 Pass and move: Having the ball in their possession, the player needs to choose quickly whether to pass it or not. If they do not pass it immediately, they need to move with it; if they do pass it, they again need to move along, following the general ball movement. This can also be used to mean that once a player has passed the ball he does not remain stationary but moves into a position where he can receive the ball again and give more options to the player in possession. The aim is to create a forward motion by moving the ball across areas where the defence are not (easily) able to create any momentum for themselves.
 Give and go: In essence a type of "pass and move", and an essential part of the "target man" style of play (see below). The player in possession of the ball plays a pass to a teammate and then immediately seeks to move into free space. If the passer can "lose" their defensive marker (either through pace, movement, superior fitness or a lack of awareness on the part of the defender) they are then free to receive a return pass and advance towards the goal and possible create (or finish) a scoring chance. When the ball is immediately returned to the first player this is known as a "one-two" (in British parlance). A version of this play involving a through ball into space as a return to the initial passer (referred to as a wall pass in some languages) is sometimes used to get past the first level of defence (for example).

 Switching sides: The use of a square or cross pass across the width of the pitch to a player on the far side is an effective option for relieving pressure and opening up spaces for the attack. The defending team will have to adjust their positions and this normally opens up space that may be exploited. In this example, the player numbered 1 has moved out of position, allowing more space for the opposing player. By playing the ball to the other side (the curved line represents an aerial pass), the recipient of the pass finds themselves in open space. (See Ex. 1)
 Through ball (slide-rule pass): Identifies spaces behind the opponent's defensive line. Passes into this area have a number of upsides: If an attacking player manages to receive the pass while onside, the player may end up with a 1-on-1 opportunity with the goalkeeper, or otherwise be in an advanced position for a wide attack. If a defender intercepts the pass, the outcome could still be good for the attacking team, as they are in a situation near the goal line, which could lead to a corner, a throw in or a turnover.  Typically, teams with fast attacking players will try challenging this space. If the opposing team has a slower defence, this may prompt them to keep a rather low back line.

 Long through ball: A deep and oftentimes aerial pass from a team's own half or the start of the opposing side's half, intended to go over the heads of the other team's defence. It is meant for the attacking players to chase and therefor they must remain in an onside position until the ball is kicked. The tactic works well with strong and fast forwards who have a good ability to control the ball and creating a scoring chance. (See Ex. 2)
 Passing at the back: This tactic is commonly used at the own half (if opponent pressure is imminent and the side which is in control of the ball seeks to calm down the play) so as to gain momentum for a new attempt to attack or just to retain ball possession in the course of a favourable score in the game. With the aim of keeping the ball in control, this tactic involves three, four or five defenders where the full backs normally are positioned slightly higher than the centre halves. At times referred to as time-wasting should the ball controlling side not actively looking to initiate an attack.
 Triangular play: A specific type of the give-and-go tactic; allows for a safe and quick movement of various areas in play whilst maintaining control of the ball. In a triangular play the ball is passed between three players to form a triangle. The triangle is then shifted to a different position when a new player is added. Many triangles can be created with various combinations of players with the intent to incrementally move the ball forward without compromising possession. This tactic is common when trying to gain control of midfield. However it may also be used for (final 3rd) attacking purposes. 
Swapping wings: Having two available and positionally flexible wide men at their disposal, a coach might let them interchange positions in the course of a game. The intent is to disarrange opponents assigned to them, possibly leading to opportunities as the opponents try to find their players to cover. Also, if the wingers have different playing styles (one favouring crossing from deep positions whilst the other is prone to trying to dribble past their marker for example), it is a way to take advantage of a weakness in the opponent's coverage. If the wingers have a different foot preference (meaning one is left-footed and the other is right-footed), swapping sides may make for some interesting attacking movement.
 In the space between the opponent's defensive line and midfield line (the "hole"): A common strategy of attack is to pass (or move) the ball into the spaces between the opponent's defenders and midfielders. If a pass is made, a midfielder in an advanced position or an attacker in a deeper position will want to receive the ball right between the lines of the opponent. A player can also try to move the ball into this area on their own, at which point they may look for a passing option; alternatively attempting to create a good scoring chance on their own.
Strong side overloads: Attacking teams may pressure the defence on to one side of the pitch by moving most of its attackers and midfielders to the ball side while letting a wing player or defender come to the opposite side with little or no coverage. By compressing space in the areas where the ball is, the defence has to respect the strong side threat by adding extra players into the mix. The ball is then crossed or passed into an unmarked area on the far side of the pitch for a free or near free shot, dribble or pass.
Target man: The implied use of a quality striker who has the ability to take on the whole defence on their own - and will often occupy two defenders - making the defence vulnerable. Complemented with two fast wingers, this tactic may give the 4-man defence potential problems. Teams may also benefit from a target man at set pieces. Examples of strikers adept at playing this role are: Alan Shearer, Duncan Ferguson, Chris Sutton, Luca Toni, Nikola Žigić, Zlatan Ibrahimović, Peter Crouch, Didier Drogba, Miroslav Klose, Troy Deeney and Aleksandar Mitrović.
Counter-attack: This strategy involves the use of a fast-paced attack, often immediately following a defensive transition of the ball. It could also refer to attacking in situations where the defensive coverage of the opponents have made a mistake by leaving (wide) spaces open to attack. This strategy requires fast players with good split-vision and quick thinking, as the ball is to transfer large distances of the field in a matter of seconds. Forwards will try to position themselves in open spaces either in or near the penalty box for a quick finish upon receiving the ball.
Cross into the box: A player (often a winger, wide midfielder or fullback) situated outside the width of the penalty box (on one of the flanks) attempts a cross into the penalty box, for a teammate (usually a striker, or a forward) to try to score on (with a header, a volley, or a one touch shot). Crosses into the box can be of various height and length and target various areas of the penalty box. For this to work, the player attempting the cross needs to be skilled at performing this type of pass, as well as able to read the game of play, and the receiving target has to have a number of competitive advantages (such as height, strength, speed or heading skills) in order to beat the defence for the attempt at goal.

Lanes of play 
There are in general three lanes of play - left, right and middle. The left and right lanes are also referred to as "flanks", and attacking in these two channels doesn't differ very much, except for the possible necessity for left-footed players on the left flank, for the purpose of crossing for example. The middle lane is a bit different, as it is the central lane of play, and also where the goal is. It necessitates attentive players who can cut through defensive lines with passes or play-moves that either vertically or diagonally ask questions to the stability and integrity of defence.

When making runs across the pitch in offense, whether horizontal, diagonal or vertical, these run lanes need to be a coordinated team effort, as one outfield player or even a part of the team (such as the midfield) need to trust other outfield players to cover for them when making these runs. In that way, the offensive game becomes a matter of balancing the optimism shown by forward runs with cautiousness in having players covering for them. This accounts for runs both on and off the ball.

Set pieces

Free kicks 

Free kicks come into play all over the field following a foul or other infraction. Indirect free kicks must be touched by another player before any shot is taken. Direct free kicks can be made directly on goal. If the free kick is close to goal (within 35-40 yards), the defensive side will often form a "wall" of anything from 2-6 players in order to block the (expected) upcoming shot. In this case, the free kick taker may attempt several tricks to beat the defenders. Attackers may attempt to blast the ball through the defensive wall, or curl it over or around the wall using spin. A less common idea is to hit the ball powerfully and straight along the floor, since the defenders in the wall usually jump to try and prevent a shot being lifted over their heads. However, this tactic has become less effective in the modern game, as defending teams usually assign one player to lie down behind the wall to block any low attempts.

If the free kick is close to goal but in a less-than-ideal angle to attempt to take a shot on goal, a common method of creating a scoring chance is to cross the ball into the penalty area, usually aiming for a spot in the angle towards the penalty spot, at which attacking players will try to beat defending players to the ball in order for a header or volleyball shot to hit the target. This is common to a corner kick.

David Beckham, Juninho, Siniša Mihajlović, Ronaldinho, Zico, Andrea Pirlo, Pierre van Hooijdonk, Neymar, Roberto Carlos, Francesco Totti, Lionel Messi, Álvaro Recoba, Cristiano Ronaldo, Rivaldo, Juan Román Riquelme, Steven Gerrard, Wayne Rooney, Sejad Salihović, Rogério Ceni, Michel Platini, Alessandro Del Piero, Thierry Henry, Roberto Baggio, Diego Maradona, Frank Lampard, Leighton Baines, Wesley Sneijder, Luis Suárez, Christian Eriksen, Reto Ziegler Miralem Pjanić, Trent Alexander-Arnold and Gareth Bale are known to score from free kick positions.

Throw-ins 
How throw-ins are best handled depends on where it is:
In one's own half the aim of a throw-in may be to retain possession in order to build up the next attack. The throw may or may not go toward the opponents' goal; the most unmarked player may be a full-back who is behind the ball. Such a throw followed by a quickly taken 'switch' pass can be an effective tactic. Under pressure however, the ball is often thrown up the line, toward the opponents' goal line to gain as much ground as possible.
If the thrower is unmarked, a simple tactic is to take a short throw to the feet or chest of a marked player who immediately returns the ball to the thrower.
In the last third of the pitch a player with a long throw can put pressure onto the defenders by throwing the ball deep into the opponents' penalty area, resulting in somewhat similar tactics to a corner kick or a free kick situation, but with the added advantage of avoiding the offside trap that could be used by opponents in a free kick, as an attacking player cannot be offside from a throw in (the same applies for corner kicks). Players well known for their long throwing skills are Rory Delap, Giorgio Chiellini and Morten Gamst Pedersen.

Goal kicks 
A goal kick is an important 'set piece' that will occur many times in a game. If taken quickly the kick may be taken short to a full-back who has run into a wide position. Although this may gain little ground it retains the all-important possession of the ball. A longer kick to the midfield is more common and it is vital that the midfield unit are in a position to receive it. Some goalkeepers may take advantage of no offside rule while taking a Goal Kick to quickly pass the ball to a striker while the opposite team is still repositioning. One of the best examples of this tactic is Ederson Moraes of Manchester City, who often takes advantage of his strong and precise long kick to catch the opposition off guard.

Corners 
A corner kick (or "corner") is a real goal scoring opportunity and it is essential to know who is the best at taking a good corner from both the left and right side of the pitch. A good corner will be aimed high across the goal and may be 'bent' towards or away from the goal. At least one of the forwards should be on or close to the goal line when the kick is taken.

Another tactic on a corner is to let the best shooter stay in the back "trash" position and have the defence worried about those up front. The player taking the corner kick makes a small pass back to the trash shooter who has time and space to take a good shot.

Defensive tactics 
All outfield players on the pitch are assigned defensive roles of which depend to an extent upon tactics. In principle, there are two ways of defending, zone defence and man-to-man defence. In a zone defence, defensive players mainly move in synchronicity with teammates, whereas a man-to-man defence players mainly moves in relation to opposing players. Whenever defensive players are given, or give themselves, a larger degree of freedom, hybrids of the two are seen. Today it is common for teams to use a combination of the two systems. 

Defensive systems may pose as a strength or a weakness, as talented attacking sides are adept at profiting from the lack of defensive structure shown by subpar defensive sides. Another consideration for defensive tactics is pressure width; to what extent teams allow for players to approach the sidelines when pressing wide, as contrasted to staying central, where teams who favour a wide pressing approach will allow for more than one player at or near the sidelines at a given point in time, whereas a more centered  approach to defense will usually stay at one or no players at or near the sidelines at a given point in time.

First, second and third defenders 

The first defender is the first respondent, regardless of what the opponent in possession does, seeking to obstruct dangerous plays of all sorts. 
The first defender should usually be the player closest to the opponent holding possession, but needs to be at the defending side in order to not get caught "flat footed" on the wrong side, for example. This role commonly involves the angling of the body in an attempt to guide the opponent in a given direction of play presumably preferable to the defensive side. The first defender may also indicate to the rest of the team whether to stay high or back off from pressure.

The first defender will normally keep a distance to the opponent of a couple of yards, although the exact distance will vary for every situation. The idea is to pressure the opposing player as tightly as possible without handing them the possibility of a (successful) dribble or feint. In certain cases, the first defender attempts a tackle. This increases the probability of being dribbled and passed, so it has to be managed wisely.

The direction in which to move towards the opponent with possession of the ball may be the shortest direction. However, it may be of value to curve the defensive run, in order to channel (also called "show") the opponent in a certain direction. Different teams will allow ("show") opponents either the inside (central lane) of the pitch, or the outside (outer lanes) of the pitch, depending on the situation as well as the tactics of that particular defensive side. For example, a common tactic for a first defender is to "show" the opposing player an area where they already know that a second or third defender is located, thus making it a safe choice to lead the opponents into.

The second defender provides the immediate support for the first defender. If the first defender loses his or her marking, the second defender takes over as first defender, and ideally one of the third defenders takes over as second defender. A defensive side should be organised so as to make this transition as smooth as possible. A typical distance between the second and first defender is about six metres, though this will vary from situation to situation. The most important factor is the opponent's speed. If the opposing player is moving fast, the distance should be longer. If he is standing still, the second and first defender may sometimes join forces and operate as two first defenders. A second defender also adjusts their positioning relative to where teammates of the defensive side are positioned in coverage in order to uphold defensive structure (see for example offside trap).

The role of the third defender is to provide a deeper cover. He or she is often in a stand-off position relative to the first and second defenders and therefor has a view of the "big picture" in defense, watching for any opponents moving up, and covering gaps if the first and second defenders are outmanoeuvred by the opponent. In addition, the third defender is usually tasked with informing teammates (including but not limited to first and second defenders) about potential upcoming threats. While the role of first and second defenders are relatively similar regardless of defending strategies and systems, the third defenders' role is very different in zone defence and man-to-man defence.

Depth considerations 
While line depth varies considerably depending on team strategy as well as game situation, a good "rule of thumb" for distances between defensive and midfield lines is about 16 metres (or 17-18 yards). Defensively minded teams will use a shorter line depth when compared to offensively minded teams, for example. Line depth will also depend on other factors such as line width, as well as strong- side tilt (whether the team stays central or tries to push out wide, when the ball is near the sidelines). Line depth is also likely to be less when the ball is near the defending team's penalty box, compared to further up the pitch.

When organised, the defending team may offer little resistance until the attacking team has reached a certain height on the pitch. The pressure height, or at which field depth the midfielders start acting as first and second defenders, depends on a lot of factors, such as game tactics and situation. Higher pressure teams need to make sure to win the ball back fast enough a number of times in pressure, in order for the tactic to be lucrative (as opposed to tiring). In general, defensive-minded teams will stay lower, minimising defensive risks by compressing attacking space. The pressure height may be identified by at which stage of the opposite side attacking play that the first pressure line of support kicks in.

The zone defence 

In zone defence, second and third defenders and midfielders are organised in two lines, in the transversal direction of the field, constituting a defender line and a midfielder line, the midfield line working as a "second shield" of the defence. The lines should be fairly possible, though the first defender and in some cases the second defender may rush out to pressure the opponent with the ball. A straight line of defenders may prevent spaces behind some of them because of the offside rule. Also, some opponents, for example those moving into dangerous space, may temporarily need to be man-marked. The number of players in the defender and midfielder lines is given by the football formations in play. Some formations use midfield anchors to stop attacks between the two lines.

The man-to-man defence 
In man-to-man defence, a single defender follows their opponent wherever they go. Extremely tight marking can be achieved in this way and star players can often be neutralised in a game by use of a dedicated "shadow". Since the man-to-man defence will take defenders in any part of the field, interceptions and broken plays will often offer opportunity for quick counter-attack. The Italian teams of the 1970s and 1980s often used this approach with impressive results.

The shortcomings of the man-to-man defence is a lack of depth when new attackers move up or down the field. The man-to-man defence also may allow for defenders to be drawn out of position, opening gaps for other attackers in vulnerable areas. This was Italy's flaw in the 1970 Final, according to some analysts. To overcome this problem with depth, the man to man defence may use a 'sweeper', who is a central defender and has a free role (no assigned player to mark). The sweeper sometimes may take up a position slightly behind the defensive line, as the role often involves 'sweeping up' any attacks that break through the defence and thus add valuable depth to the defensive unit. Zone defence does not require a sweeper role, and as many teams have changed their tactics on this, sweepers today are rare.

Defending at set pieces

Free-kicks from short range 
At free-kicks from short range, particularly when defending a direct free-kick, a wall of defensive players is lined up. The number of players who form the wall depends on the angle and distance from the goal, the opponent's assumed shooting skills, and the need to mark opponents to whom the ball might be passed. The wall is usually set up at the direction of the defending goalkeeper to block a direct shot at the near post. The goalkeeper is normally positioned nearer the far post. In order to increase the difficulty for the free-kick taker to kick the ball over the wall and into the goal it is common for the players in the wall to jump vertically when the kick is taken.
Defending indirect free-kicks provides different difficulties for the defending team. The wall must be prepared to charge down the ball once it has been touched by the free-kick taker, and other defenders must be alert to the attacking team's practised set-plays. Getting the ball over the wall and then to dip into the bottom corner is a superb skill.

Corner kicks and other crosses 
At corner kicks, and at direct free kick, indirect free kick or throw-ins that are likely to become a cross, most teams use man-on-man marking, even those which otherwise play zone defence. Each player is given an opponent to mark, in advanced football they usually have been assigned an opponent before the match. Substituting at the time of a defensive set piece is regarded as unwise, as play may be started before the substitute has come into marking position.

A few teams use the tactic of gathering defenders on one line on corner kicks and similar situations, in effect giving them the responsibility for zones instead of particular opponents.

Penalty kicks 
In the case of a penalty kick, no defending players except the goalkeeper are allowed within the penalty area or within ten yards of the penalty spot and 18 yards of the goal line. A significant number of players should, however, be placed right outside the penalty area, alert to advance into the area and clear any deflection. For this purpose, sometimes the attacking team will nominate two players to run at the goal from either side of the penalty spot; timing their run so that they only enter the penalty area once the kick has been taken will hopefully give them the first opportunity at gathering the ball if it is saved by the goalkeeper. This tactic is rarely seen, however, since the likelihood of the ball being saved and then falling into the path of the attacking player is small.  A particular tactic that can be used by the goalkeeper involves trying to distract the penalty taker by drawing his concentration away from striking the ball cleanly. Such tactics normally involve moving one's body, or body parts, in an extravagant manner, or through verbal comments. Famous examples of where this worked successfully include Bruce Grobbelaar in the 1984 European Cup final, and Jerzy Dudek in the 2005 Champions League Final.

"Forward" versus "collapsing" defences 
Some teams use forward defending, aggressively challenging the ball when on the defensive in any part of the field. Others rely on a "collapsing" style, that falls back deep into its own half when the opponent is in possession of the ball. The "forward" policy can put immense physical and psychological pressure on opponents, and is aimed at slowing down or breaking up attacks early. It has more physical demands however, and may spread a defensive formation more thinly. In general, defensive-minded teams will stay lower, minimising defensive risks by compressing attacking space. The "collapsing" approach is more economical in physical demand, and provides a packed back zone to thwart attacks. However it sometimes creates large gaps in midfield, and invites the opposing team to dribble forward and to take shots from long range; if the opposing team is good at the two aforementioned skills then goals will be conceded freely.

The most extreme form of "forward" defending, Gegenpressing ("counter-pressing"), invented by Ralf Rangnick and exemplified by teams managed by German managers such as Jürgen Klopp and Thomas Tuchel, requires each attacker to press the opposition immediately upon loss of possession.

Defending with the ball 
Clearing is when the player in possession of the ball is put under pressure, often near the own goal, and so chooses to clear the ball away simply in order to get the ball out of a dangerous area of play. When opponent pressure is high, the ball is at times cleared to a corner kick or to a throw-in. Clearing long, but into opponent control, may give the defence time and the opportunity to organise, including setting up the correct formation and pressure height. If confident in their ability to do so, a player might also try to clear the ball up to a higher-situated teammate, in order not to give away possession of the ball to the other side.

If the attack was high up the field, such as in or near the penalty area, defenders will thus quickly push out, and attackers will then be forced to retreat in order to avoid offside in the next move. Clearing may be combined with an attempt to hit a long pass or a long through ball. Players high up in the field who are pressed hard, and who are eager to avoid a counter-attack, may in some instances combine clearing with a shot. A team composed of good passers and mobile players with good positioning skills may more often try to avoid clearing, as their skills make it easier to make shorter passes and thus retain possession until they get out of a difficult situation.

Retaining possession in this way may also be regarded as a longer-term way of defending, as the opposing team cannot attack when they don't have the ball. With the ball, the team applying this tactic can simply pass the ball between each other - as in the possession football style, but with little or no intention of building up an attack, thus decreasing the risk of a break.

The main benefit of this tactic is that the team is in complete control over its opponents. Meanwhile, by knocking the ball around, opponents playing the pressing game can easily tire. And should an opportunity suddenly arise, defence may be quickly switched to attack. A major downfall is that because the accuracy of passes needs to be high, short passes between the players are required. This significantly narrows the gap between the attack, midfield and defence (usually, the latter is forced to push up). So if the opponent gains possession, a long ball could effectively open up the defence. Similarly, if it is the attack and midfield that need to drop back, the team will have little chances of counter-attacking even if possession is won back.

Notable examples 
Football coaches and technical manuals such as Soccer Skills and tactics, and The Soccer Coaching Bible, often use visual symbols and diagrams to demonstrate the principles described above, and to link principles to historical games. The following examples combine technical coaching observations with championship play descriptions at the World Cup level as in Brian Glanville's World Cup, (1994). The written descriptions are diagrammed for the reader to better understand various football tactics and skills as they are applied in the real world, at the highest levels.

Combined team play using width and depth: Brazil vs Italy, 1970 final 

Beating a defence using width and depth. Astute use of the principles of width and depth led to the last goal of the 1970 FIFA World Cup final, considered by many to be the best combined team effort in Cup history. Almost all the players of Brazil touched the ball in this effort that penetrated one of the tightest defences ever seen, the famous Italian catenaccio "padlock" defence. The Italians used four defenders, plus a sweeper, Pierluigi Cera, behind the "back four." They relied on a counter-attacking game, deploying three midfielders and two strikers, and closely marked opponents man to man.

This tight system however involved a "collapsing" approach that while packing the Italian penalty area and denying the Brazilian forwards much space, left relatively large gaps in midfield. See "Standing Off" defensive discussion above. Brazil's superb skills exploited this weakness, showing especially that any defence (whether man to man, zone or other variants) can be beaten using the principles of both width and depth. The weakness of the man to man system was also exposed. Italian left back Giacinto Facchetti dedicated himself to winger Jairzinho, shadowing him tightly wherever he went. Jairzinho cunningly moved off the right flank, opening gaps for others to follow as can be seen below. See "Switching the attack" and "Swapping wing men" above for discussion of this aspect of offensive tactics.

Italian defence pulled left in quick sequence. Brazilian midfielder Clodoaldo began the move with a weaving dribble out to the left flank, that beat three men and essentially pulled the Italian defence in that direction. A fatal gap was thus eventually opened up for the run of fullback Carlos Alberto Torres on the right. Clodoaldo eased the ball to the Rivelino moving up on the left. Rivellino quickly played the ball forward to Jairzinho, who crossed the field to appear on the left flank.

Movement in centre "freezes" Italian defence.  Almost without pause the powerful Jairzinho began a weaving run. Facchetti played Jairzinho well, backing off the ball, and squeezing him inside where it was more crowded. Good defenders will "channel" (see discussion above) an attacker into areas with less space. So far, all seemed safe for Italy. Facchetti covered well, as did the other Italian defenders. There were two extra men as insurance in the back as Jairzinho began his run. Depth is also a principle of defence, and the sweeper system (or other arrangements) provides such.

As Jairzinho accelerated, the ever dangerous striker Tostão began a sprint up the middle, drawing his defender with him, diverting the Italian defence and making more room for Jairzinho. Younger players should note the movement off the ball by Brazil. Increasingly squeezed inside, Jairzinho's run nevertheless drew the defence to him and he eased the ball to Pelé in the centre. Always dangerous, Pelé paused and shaped to make a dribble.

Overlapping defender exploits principle of depth to cap the move. For the Italian defence, there was still no cause for undue alarm. Pelé seemed well covered, and there was still the sweeper at the back as insurance behind the defence. Nevertheless, Pelé's feint, combined with the previous moves, kept Italian focus frozen in the middle, attracting the attention of three men, and he casually slipped the ball right- to Carlos Alberto who was thundering up from the rear, totally unmarked.

Pelé played the ball well ahead of Alberto, using space intelligently, so that the fast fullback ran on and shot without pausing, in full stride, smashing the ball into the Italian net. So effective was Brazil's use of width, that no Italian defender is even within reasonable striking distance of Alberto until the last moment. The principle of width stretched and drew the Italian defence. The principle of depth—fresh men moving up from the rear—allowed Brazil to exploit the gaps created by width.

Penetration and envelopment in attack: Banks versus Pelé, Mexico 1970 

Penetration in attack- the forward or through pass: To a footballer, the penetration pass is one of the first methods learned in attack, whether it be the simple "kick and chase" of the youth leagues, or the exquisite through-balls by today's world class stars. Penetration by pass is the quickest method of advancing the ball towards the enemy goal. When well executed, it can yield spectacular results. Penetration in attack however requires more than mere passing. Players without the ball must move into space, and must time their runs so as not to be caught offside.

Envelopment in attack: the central cross. Attacking an opposing side from the flanks using crosses from the wings is among the oldest and most effective football tactics. An attack from the flanks uses width to stretch an opposing defence creating gaps in the goal area to be exploited. While the direction of the lateral cross is not as straightforward as the through-ball, both types of passes serve to split an enemy defence, in view of striking at the vital central area of the goal. This example, the legendary confrontation between keeper Gordon Banks of England and Pelé of Brazil at 1970 FIFA World Cup Group 3 match, captures the two types of attack in one snapshot. It also serves to illustrate the difficulties in defending against both types of passes.

Two pass types - one great defensive save. The powerful running of Brazil's right winger Jairzinho set the stage, with initial direction by captain Carlos Alberto. Sprinting down the flank, Jairzinho pounced on an excellent through pass from Alberto, accelerated past Cooper the English back, and lofted a high arcing cross to Pelé in the centre. Pelé headed down powerfully and was already raising his arms in triumph when Banks leaped to his right "like a salmon over a fall" Pelé said later, and somehow flailed the bouncing ball over the crossbar, saving a sure goal. The Brazilian forward said it was the greatest save he had ever seen. Offensively, this play demonstrates how both types of passes can divide and stretch a defence. Jairzinho's running and cross was set up by an excellent forward pass, and his centre to Pelé capped a move that should have resulted in a goal, were it not for the extraordinary skill of English keeper, Gordon Banks. Offside traps are one way to defend against both pass types, but the ultimate solution is defensive depth and sound goalkeeping.

Two-man combination 

Using the two-man combination. The two-man combination pass, variously called the wall pass, the "one-two", the "give and go" and other local names, is among the simplest yet most powerful team techniques in football. It requires a fair level of individual skill to pull off, yet this should not stop coaches from introducing it early in the higher youth leagues, nor should players from these leagues neglect it in favour of the all too easy "kick and chase". There are two ways to execute it:  pass and run to space for the return pass without pausing or  pass then pause briefly to gauge opposing reaction before running into an open spot for the return. In tight conditions, the first method is better, while the second can be used where there is a bit more space to operate.

Power of the two-man combination: Netherlands vs Brazil, 1974. Simple as it is, the two-man move can penetrate the teeth of the densest, most negative opposition. Peru brought it to a high art on the World Cup stage in 1970, under their coach Didi, Brazil's former midfield general of 1958 and 1962. Time after time Peruvian forwards like Cubillas, Gallardo, and Sotil put a central combination on the floor that sliced through the opposition and created countless dangerous situations. The Dutch team of 1974 were also disciples of the two-man combination. The diagram here shows the first Dutch goal in the 1974 game that crushed Brazil's repeat championship hopes - product of an exchange between Johan Neeskens and Johan Cruyff. A two-man move also set up the second goal for Cruyff in the game. Contrast with the "hand" of Diego Maradona below.

Potential of the two-man combination: Maradona's "hand of god" goal – 1986.
The example shown below, the first goal of Diego Maradona against England in 1986, is used to illustrate the potential of the move. Argentina utilised it frequently, being ideally suited to their crisp, quick, short passing style. As he had often done during the game, Maradona initiated the sequence with a quick dribbling run into the packed central area. Surrounded, he began a two-man combo pass - slipping the ball to Jorge Valdano on the right, and then moving up for the reply. Valdano pivoted and attempted to return, but conditions were too tight. Hodge, the English midfielder, intercepted and rather dangerously, attempted to tap the ball back to his keeper, Shilton. Maradona and Shilton raced towards the floating ball, which connected with Maradona's hand (the so-called "hand of god" goal), past Shilton, into the goal. While much controversy still surrounds the goal, Maradona's run illustrates how even the tightest conditions can be pried open with the two-man exchange. It also illustrates how the simple two-man combination can create countless dangerous situations and force opponents into making errors.

Three-man move 

Effectiveness of three-man strike teams. The three-man move is another very effective weapon in the attacking arsenal. It is distinguished from simple passing between players in that the initiator of the move finishes it with a shot on goal or a well-placed pass leading to a shot. It is thus a collaboration of three distinct players. Famous three-man strike teams are legendary in football, from the earliest days, through the famous Hungarian sides of the 1950s, to the "clockwork orange" of the Dutch masters in the 1970s, through the German, Italian, French, Argentinian, Brazilian, and other teams of the contemporary era. The three-man package can be more effective than the two-man combo because it gives more attacking options and causes more confusion in the defence. The initial pass cannot be quickly cut off as in the two-man manoeuvre which really has only one option. Typically the second pass in the three-man move lures and diverts defenders on to false ground. This gives the initiator of the sequence time to run into an advantageous position. Triple player collaborations of course do not operate in isolation – they have other supporting players – but the tight three-man exchange still remains a fundamental pillar of successful attacking play.

Brazil vs Uruguay 1970 – strike package: Jairzinho – Pelé – Tostão. The example below, is drawn from one of the most famous strike teams in World Cup history- Pelé, Tostão and Jairzinho. This goal, against Uruguay in the 1970 semi-final, captures the power of the move. The fast winger Jairzinho set the stage- dribbling down the right flank before finding Pelé ahead. Tightly marked, and with his back to the goal, Pelé immediately played a subtle pass to Tostão. The Brazilian centre-forward drew the defence to him with a short dribble before finding Jairzinho again on the wing. This exchange of passes gave Jairzinho a lead on other defenders and he made the most of it – accelerating down the wing, selling a dummy (letting the ball run after pretending to stop and play it) on Uruguayan defender Matosas, and muscling him aside as he approached the enemy goal. Uruguayan keeper Mazurkiewicz came off his line but it was simply too late, as Jairzinho slotted the ball into the net. Of note in this sequence is the attacking space created by the tight exchanges between Jairzinho, Pelé, and Tostão. Even the Uruguayans, playing one of the most densely packed, solid defences seen in a World Cup could not stop it. Jairzinho is surrounded by opposing defenders when the sequence starts, but at the end, he only has one to deal with. Also of note is the unselfish passing of Brazilian striker Tostão, with his skill creating countless openings for his teammates throughout the 1970 tournament.

Quick long-ball counter-attack 

Counter attacking Football involves a team withdrawing players into their own half but ensuring that one or two players are committed to the attack. One such example is the quick counter-strike mounted by England against Germany in the 1970 World Cup. Defensive midfielder Alan Mullery began the move, lofting a long through pass over the heads of three German defenders, to Newton on the right flank. Not pausing to admire his handiwork, Mullery kept moving up. Newton, a defensive player was placed in an excellent attacking position with few opponents to check his progress. Newton advanced on a short dribble, before producing a low, outstanding diagonal cross that found Mullery, who had sprinted into the goalmouth. Mullery finished what he had started, by driving the ball home past the German goalkeeper Sepp Maier. Tactically, this goal combines the power of the long pass with that of the two-man combination, and indeed, before his pass to Newton, Mullery had exchanged passes with Francis Lee before setting off on his final combination run. This move was pulled off by two normally defensively oriented players, showing that the long-ball counter-strike can be successful from a deep position on the field with any combination of skilled players.

Free-kicks and set-pieces 
Indirect free-kicks can throw a defence into confusion when taken quickly, or in unexpected directions. The third goal of Brazil's 1970 World Cup victory over Italy illustrates the method. Brazil's midfield general Gerson Nunes approached rapidly and lofted the dead ball in a high arc almost from the midfield line. It found Pelé perfectly positioned near the Italian goal. The Brazilian headed down softly and accurately, straight into the path of the onrushing winger Jairzinho, who virtually walked the ball into the net. Italy's catenaccio defence was caught out of position here, not only failing to neutralise Pelé, but providing little cover to stop Jairzinho. A rapid, daring set-piece kick will often accomplish this unbalancing of defences.

Direct free-kicks are a key part of attacking in football, and can lead to many goals. Numerous feints and ruses are tried to fool the opposition, including having attackers join the "wall." A successful free kick from the 1970 World Cup- Brazil vs Czechoslovakia, illustrates how the technique works. Brazilian forwards Jairzinho and Tostao cunningly joined the end of the defensive wall as the Czechs set it up. As Pelé backed off and feinted as if to take the kick, both Jair and Tostão began to move off, creating space. Roberto Rivelino ghosted in from the side to shoot powerfully into the gap for a goal.

Moving into space – the diagonal run 

Moving into free space is one of the most critical skills that football players must develop. Attacking players must move off the ball into space to give an advance the maximum chance of success. Passes to space are feasible when there is intelligent movement of players to receive the ball and do something constructive with it. Skilled players are able to find seams between defenders, positioning themselves to receive a pass.

This diagram shows a productive use of space by West Germany in the 1974 FIFA World Cup Final which led to Gerd Müller's game-winning goal against the Netherlands. German midfielder Rainer Bonhof made a long diagonal run out to the right side of the field, putting put him clear of the Dutch opposition. Deep into the Dutch half, Bonhof received a ball from Jürgen Grabowski and beat Arie Haan. Bonhof sent a low cross in to Müller, who found the back of the net. Moving diagonally is one of the best offensive movements, whether at the near or far posts, or out to the wings farther back in midfield. Diagonal movement creates added space to maneuver, compared to simply running straight ahead or laterally. It also means that players must be willing to switch positions as the situation demands.

Studies 
Although the scientific research field of association football is still in its early days, some interesting studies are emerging. It has for example been shown, that in possession play, successful teams have both longer and more frequent possessions in the offensive areas of the pitch, as well as finding it easier to move the ball into the offensive areas of the pitch, after initiating possession, when compared to unsuccessful teams. As a defensive strategy, research has suggested that being able to consistently pose players immediately behind the ball, as well as in other areas of proximity to the ball indicates a positive correlation with defensive goal prevention both when in and out of possession.

Statistical methods for modeling player analysis have proven useful in performance assessment. Similar methods find their use in predictions and evaluations of matches.

Skills

Kicking 

Kicking is a skill in which a player strikes the ball with their foot.

Basic 
Push kick, instep kick, outside kick, toe kicks.

Advanced  
Volley, Bicycle kick, Spin kick, Rabona, Scorpion kick.

Dribbling 

Dribbling is running with the ball at the feet and playing it on every step or every other step 
It means controlling and keep possession of the ball while running.

Advanced  
Cruyff turn, Marseille turn, Seal dribble, Flip flap, Step over.

Heading 

Heading is the striking of a ball in the air by a player's head.

Advanced

Diving header

Passing 

Passing is the kicking the ball to a teammate.

Basic 
Push pass, long pass, backward pass, through pass, wall pass.

Advanced 
Backhill pass

Shooting 

Shooting is an attempt to score a goal.

Tackling 

Tackling is an attempt by a player to take the ball away from a ball carrier by placing the player's leg in front of the ball.

Tricks

Dummy

Nutmeg

Rainbow kick

See also 
 Association football positions
 Association football formations
 Football club (association football)
 Glossary of association football terms

Notes

References

External links 
 Will the Bulldog's Fall Give Rise to a New Breed of English Soccer? article on International Herald Tribune - By Rob Hughes – Published: NOVEMBER 24, 1993
 How will English football develop? on the BBC